The North Main Street Historic District in the village of Moravia, New York is a national historic district which was listed on the National Register of Historic Places in 1993.  The district contains one contributing object and 44 contributing buildings.  The majority of the buildings were built between 1870 and 1890 and display the features associated with Italianate style architecture.  Italianate architecture in the United States is characterized by use of wide, even "emphatic", eaves supported by paired or single brackets (which seem to have designs unique to each building), low-pitched or flat roofs often not visible from the ground, and often cupolas or towers, as if the architecture were for a hilltop villa in Italian countryside, while in fact in the U.S. being sometimes upon a hilltop in the country but more often in town/city environments.  Another characteristic is usage of round-topped windows.

The district was listed on the National Register of Historic Places in 1993.

The district can be said to start with the "Brick Store" building at the northwest corner of Cayuga St. and N. Main St., built c.1830, which was numbered 1 North Main Street at date of NRHP listing, and then to run north along the west (odd-numbered) side of N. Main St. to the house which was numbered 37 N. Main St. (and which is now numbered 203 N. Main St.).  On the west, even-numbered side of the street, it included houses running from number 10 (per map included in NRHP document) to number 36 (now 202 N. Main St.).  And it included three properties at 5, 6, and 8 Keeler St., a cross street.  The properties along Main St., like others in Moravia outside the district, have since been renumbered, with, for example, the house at 28 N. Main St. now being 192 Main St.

It includes Italianate, Greek Revival, and Queen Anne architecture.

Odd side
Selected buildings included are:

5 Keeler 
5 Keeler, in photo 1

6 Keeler
6 keeler, in photo 2

8 Keeler

Store
1 N Main St., in photo 3

Artemus Cady House in photo 4
Artemus Cady House, at 169 N. Main St., formerly 7 N. Main St., in photo 4. ( is Italianate in style though was originally constructed c.1830 in Federal style.

11 N. Main St., in photo 6
Has round tower with conical top, in photo 6

13 N. Main St., in photo 8

15 N. Main St., in photo 8
Two-story frame Queen Anne built c.1885.  Has "elaborate spindle and pierced-work front porch." With contributing carriage barn.

21 N. Main St., in photo 10

23 N. Main St., in photo 10

25 N. Main St., in photo 10

193 N. Main St., which was ???

Italianate house at 193 N. Main St., which was??? perhaps 25 N. Main St.? not 21 or 23.

195 N. Main St., which was???
House at 195 N. Main St., which was ???

text to be edited out

"the former are located at Nos. 23, 25, and 29 North Main Street and 6 Keeler Avenue. ExamplesoftheL-shapedplanswithgableroofsarelocatedatNos.30and32NorthMainStreetand5KeelerAvenue.AllexhibitthevariouscharacteristicsassociatedwiththeItalianateStylesuchastallnarrowwindowsandbracketedeaves.OtherItalianateformsaremoreasymmetrical,suchasNo.38N.MainStreet,orarectangularblock,suchasNos.34and36N.MainStreet.FiveimposingbrickItalianateStyleresidencesarelocatedatNos.12,14,18,26,and28NorthMainStreet.Nos.12and14N.MainStreetexhibitsimilardetails. Both are L-shaped with paired brackets between which are small round arched vents or windows. Thesegmentallintelsarebrickwithpendants. The entrance of No. 12 North Main Street is set in a pointed arched brick architrave but the front porch has been removed. Inspite of the lossoftheporchandsomewindows,thisbuildingretainsmanyofitsItalianatedetailsanditsimposingmassing.No.28NorthMainStreetissimilarinplantoNo.12NorthMainStreet.No.28,liketheotherbrickresidences,featuressegmentallyarchedwindowsandbracketedeavesbutthelintelsarefashionedofwoodandthesillsareofcastiron.TheHewettHouse,No.26NorthMainStreet,displaysirregularmassing,withatwo-story,three-sidedbayonthefacade.Thepointedarchedentranceincorporatesahoodsupportedbyornatelycarvedbrackets.Thewindowsaresurroundedbybricklintelswithcastironkeystones,impostblocksandlimestonesills.No.18NorthMainStreetisprovidedwithageneroussetbackonalargecornerlot.ThisbrickItalianateVillastylehousefeaturespairedarchedwindows,arcadedporches,andanelaboratecastironbalcony. The Artemus Cady House at No. 7 North Main Street exhibits Italianate features, such as bracketed eaves and Italianate style porch, though it was originally constructed circa 1830 in the Federal style. This rectangular wood frame structure is clad in wood shingles added..."

37 N. Main St.

Italianate house at 203 N. Main St. (formerly 37 N. Main St.), built c.1870, with vinyl siding added before NRHP listing.  "Elaborate front porch with pierce-work[?] balustrade."

Even side

10 N. Main St.
(photo #5 in NRHP doc)

12 N. Main St.
(photo #7 in NRHP doc, has circular whatsits between paired brackets)

18 N. Main St.
The one that is now an Inn, in photo 9

24 N. Main St.
???

26 N. Main St.

190 N. Main St., formerly 26 N. Main St., [a favorite?]

28 N. Main St.

Two-story brick Italianate house built c.1870, with hipped roof, segmental arch windows, and cut stone foundation.

30 N. Main St.

Frame Italianate house with clapboard exterior, built c.1870., at 194 N. Main St., formerly 30 N. Main St.

32 N. Main St.

House at 196 N. Main St., formerly 32 N. Main St., built c.1870, considered to be a frame Italianate cottage.

34 N. Main St.

One-and-a-half-story frame cottage with bracketed cornice.  Formerly 34 N. Main St., now 198 N. Main St. Has contributing carriage barn behind.

36 N. Main St.

House at 202 N. Main St., formerly 36 N. Main St., is a frame Italianate house with vinyl siding before date of NRHP listing.

The historic district boundaries now includes some newer structures.  A small house, possibly a single-wide, at what is now 201 N. Main St., in between what were 35 and 37 N. Main St., is apparently an infill built after the historic district listing.<ref>Site visits, 2022<.ref>

References

External links

Historic districts on the National Register of Historic Places in New York (state)
Historic districts in Cayuga County, New York
National Register of Historic Places in Cayuga County, New York
Moravia (village), New York